Lee Sung-woon (born December 25, 1978) is a South Korean  retired football player. He formerly played for Seongnam Ilhwa Chunma, Daejeon Citizen, and Busan IPark.

References

External links

1978 births
Living people
South Korean footballers
Seongnam FC players
Daejeon Hana Citizen FC players
Korean Police FC (Semi-professional) players
Busan IPark players
K League 1 players
Korea National League players
Association football midfielders
Sportspeople from Busan